Mam Manivan Phaninvong (1934 – April 1975) was a Cambodian princess.

Life
She was born in Vientiane, Laos. She married King Norodom Sihanouk of Cambodia in 1949, becoming his fourth wife. They had two daughters, Princess Norodom Sujata and the Royal Princess Norodom Arunrasmy.

During the Fall of Phnom Penh, she took refuge at the French Embassy. On 18 April the Khmer Rouge ordered all Cambodians who had taken refuge in the French Embassy, other than women married to Frenchmen, to leave the Embassy or they would take over the embassy, they rejected any right of asylum. Among those evicted was Princess Mam Manivan Phanivong, along with Khy-Taing Lim the Minister of Finance and Loeung Nal the Minister of Health.

She was murdered by the Khmer Rouge in April 1975.

References

1934 births
1975 deaths
Spouses of prime ministers of Cambodia
People executed by the Khmer Rouge
Executed royalty
Executed Cambodian women
Cambodian people of Laotian descent